is a Japanese basketball player for Mitsubishi Electric Koalas and the Japanese national team.

She participated at the 2018 FIBA Women's Basketball World Cup.

References

1995 births
Living people
Japanese women's basketball players
Shooting guards
21st-century Japanese women